ASCII Media Works is a Japanese publishing company, and the result of the merger between ASCII and MediaWorks on April 1, 2008 where MediaWorks legally absorbed ASCII. MediaWorks began developing and publishing video games with their Super Famicom port of Emerald Dragon in July 1995. Since ASCII Media Works is a continuation of MediaWorks, the company includes the video games previously produced before the merger with ASCII on their official website for their video games. Many of the video games have been adapted from light novels published by ASCII Media Works under their Dengeki Bunko imprint such as Shakugan no Shana, Kino's Journey, and Spice and Wolf, among others.

Video games

MediaWorks

Console games

Portable games

ASCII Media Works

Console games

Portable games

References

 
 
Video game lists by company